Pleasantville is a 1998 American teen fantasy comedy-drama film written, co-produced, and directed by Gary Ross. It stars Tobey Maguire, Jeff Daniels, Joan Allen, William H. Macy, J. T. Walsh, and Reese Witherspoon, with Don Knotts, Paul Walker, Marley Shelton and Jane Kaczmarek in supporting roles. The story centers on two siblings who wind up trapped in a 1950s TV show, set in a small Midwest town, where residents are seemingly perfect.

The film was one of J. T. Walsh's final performances and was dedicated to his memory.

Plot
High-schoolers David and his sister Jennifer lead very different lives: Jennifer is shallow, while David spends most of his time watching Pleasantville, a black-and-white 1950s sitcom about the idyllic Parker family. One evening while their mother is away, David and Jennifer fight over the television, breaking the remote control.

A mysterious TV repairman arrives and, impressed by David's knowledge of Pleasantville, gives him a strange remote control before departing. When they use the remote control, David and Jennifer are transported into the black-and-white world of Pleasantville, finding themselves in the Parkers' living room. David tries to reason with the repairman, communicating through the Parkers' television, but the repairman declares that the world of Pleasantville is better than the real world and they should be lucky to live in it.

Forced to act as the show's characters, Bud and Mary Sue Parker, David and Jennifer explore the wholesome but peculiar town. Fire does not exist and firefighters merely rescue cats from trees, and the citizens of Pleasantville are unaware that anything exists outside of their town, as all roads circle back with no escape. David tells Jennifer they must stay in character and not disrupt the town. Trying to maintain the show's plot, Jennifer dates a boy from school and tells him about what dating is like for her, a concept unknown to him and everyone else in town.

Slowly, parts of Pleasantville change from black-and-white to color, including flowers and the faces of people who experience new bursts of emotion, and foreign concepts such as books, fire, and rain begin to appear. After Jennifer introduces new ideas to her peers, many of her classmates go to the garden to read, becoming "colored" in the process.

David introduces Bill Johnson, owner of the soda fountain where Bud works, to colorful modern art via a book from the library, sparking Bill's interest in painting. After learning about caring for herself, Betty starts a fire and becomes colored. Jennifer/Mary Sue becomes colored after developing a newfound interest in literature. Bill and Betty fall in love and she leaves home, bewildering her husband George. Only the town fathers remain unchanged. They are led by the mayor, Big Bob, who views the changes as a threat to Pleasantville's values, and resolve to do something about their increasingly independent wives and rebellious children.

As the townsfolk become more colorful, a ban on "colored" people is initiated in public venues. A riot is ignited by Bill's nude painting of Betty on the window of his malt shop. The soda fountain is destroyed, books are burned and people who are "colored" are harassed in the street, while Betty is harassed by non-colored teenage boys. David/Bud punches one of the boys and scares them away, demonstrating newfound courage that turns him colored. The town fathers forbid people from visiting the library, playing loud music, or using colorful paint.

In protest, David and Bill paint a colorful mural depicting their world, prompting their arrest. Brought to trial in front of the entire town, David and Bill defend their actions and arouse enough anger and indignation in Big Bob that he becomes colored as well and flees. Celebrating their victory, David notices that the television store now sells color televisions, broadcasting new programs and footage of other countries and that the town's roads now lead to other cities.

With Pleasantville changed, Jennifer chooses to continue her new life in the TV world. Bidding farewell to his sister, his new girlfriend, and Betty, David uses the remote control to return to the real world while only an hour went by there. He comforts his mother, who had left to meet a man only to get cold feet, and assures her that nothing has to be perfect.

A montage reveals the citizens of Pleasantville enjoying their new lives, including Jennifer/Mary Sue attending college, while Betty, George and Bill contemplate the future.

Cast

Production
This was the first time that a new feature film was created by scanning and digitizing recorded film footage for the purpose of removing or manipulating colors. The black-and-white-meets-color world portrayed in the movie was filmed entirely in color; in all, approximately 163,000 frames of 35 mm footage were scanned, in order to selectively desaturate and adjust contrast digitally. The scanning was done in Los Angeles by Cinesite, utilizing a Spirit DataCine for scanning at 2K resolution and a MegaDef Colour Correction System from Pandora International. Principal Photography took place from March 1 to July 2, 1997.

The death of camera operator Brent Hershman, who fell asleep driving home after a 19-hour workday on the set of the film, resulted in a wrongful death suit, claiming that New Line Cinema, New Line Productions and Juno Pix Inc. were responsible for the death as a result of the lengthy work hours imposed on the set. In response to Hershman's death, crew members launched a petition for “Brent’s Rule”, which would limit workdays to a maximum of 14 hours; the petition was ultimately unsuccessful.

The film is dedicated to Hershman, as well as to director Ross's mother, Gail, and actor J. T. Walsh, who also died before the film's release.

Shortly before and during the film's release, an online contest was held to visit the real Pleasantville, Iowa. Over 30,000 people entered. The winner, who remained anonymous, declined the trip and opted to receive the $10,000 cash prize instead.

Themes
Director Gary Ross stated, "This movie is about the fact that personal repression gives rise to larger political oppression...That when we're afraid of certain things in ourselves or we're afraid of change, we project those fears on to other things, and a lot of very ugly social situations can develop."

Robert Beuka says in his book SuburbiaNation, "Pleasantville is a morality tale concerning the values of contemporary suburban America by holding that social landscape up against both the Utopian and the dystopian visions of suburbia that emerged in the 1950s."

Robert McDaniel of Film & History described the town as the perfect place, "It never rains, the highs and lows rest at 72 degrees, the fire department exists only to rescue treed cats, and the basketball team never misses the hoop." However, McDaniel says, "Pleasantville is a false hope. David's journey tells him only that there is no 'right' life, no model for how things are 'supposed to be'."

Warren Epstein of The Gazette wrote, "This use of color as a metaphor in black-and-white films certainly has a rich tradition, from the over-the-rainbow land in The Wizard of Oz to the girl in the red dress who made the Holocaust real for Oskar Schindler in Schindler's List. In Pleasantville, color represents the transformation from repression to enlightenment. People—and their surroundings—change from black-and-white to color when they connect with the essence of who they really are."

Reception

Box office
Pleasantville earned $8.9 million during its opening weekend. It would ultimately earn a total of $40.8 million against a $60 million budget, despite the critical success.

Critical reception
Pleasantville received positive reviews from critics. Review aggregator Rotten Tomatoes gave the film a "Certified Fresh" 86% rating from 97 reviews, an average rating of 7.7/10, with the critical consensus: "Filled with lighthearted humor, timely social commentary, and dazzling visuals, Pleasantville is an artful blend of subversive satire and well-executed Hollywood formula."  Metacritic assigned a score of 71 based on 32 reviews, indicating "generally favorable reviews".

Roger Ebert gave the film four out of four stars calling it "one of the best and most original films of the year". Janet Maslin wrote that its "ingenious fantasy" has "seriously belabored its once-gentle metaphor and light comic spirit." Peter M. Nichols, judging the film for its child-viewing worthiness, jokingly wrote in The New York Times that the town of Pleasantville "makes Father Knows Best look like Dallas." Joe Leydon of Variety called it "a provocative, complex and surprisingly anti-nostalgic parable wrapped in the beguiling guise of a commercial high-concept comedy." He commented that some storytelling problems emerge late in the film, but wrote that "Ross is to be commended for refusing to take the easy way out."

Entertainment Weekly wrote a mixed review: "Pleasantville is ultramodern and beautiful. But technical elegance and fine performances mask the shallowness of a story as simpleminded as the '50s TV to which it condescends; certainly it's got none of the depth, poignance, and brilliance of The Truman Show, the recent TV-is-stifling drama that immediately comes to mind." The film also received a mixed review from Christian Answers, but was criticized because "On a surface level, the message of the film appears to be 'morality is black and white and pleasant, but sin is color and better,' because often through the film the Pleasantvillians become color after sin (adultery, premarital sex, physical assault, etc...). In one scene in particular, a young woman shows a brightly colored apple to young (and not yet colored) David, encouraging him to take and eat it. Very reminiscent of the Genesis's account of the fall of man."

Time Out New York reviewer Andrew Johnston observed, "Pleasantville doesn't have the consistent internal logic that great fantasies require, and Ross just can't resist spelling everything out for the dim bulbs in the audience. That's a real drag, because the film's fundamental premise—crossing America's nostalgia fixation with Pirandello and the Oz/Narnia/Wonderland archetype—is so damn cool, the film really should have been a masterpiece."

Jesse Walker, writing a retrospective in the January 2010 issue of Reason, argued that the film was misunderstood as a tale of kids from the 1990s bringing life into the conformist world of the 1950s. Walker points out that the supposedly outside influences changing the town of Pleasantville—the civil rights movement, J. D. Salinger, modern art, premarital sex, cool jazz and rockabilly—were all present in the 1950s. Pleasantville "contrasts the faux '50s of our TV-fueled nostalgia with the social ferment that was actually taking place while those sanitized shows first aired."

Accolades

Soundtrack 

The soundtrack features music from the 1950s and 1960s such as "Be-Bop-A-Lula" by Gene Vincent, "Take Five" by The Dave Brubeck Quartet, "So What" by Miles Davis and "At Last" by Etta James. The main score was composed by Randy Newman; he received an Oscar nomination in the original music category. A score release is also in distribution, although the suite track is only available on the standard soundtrack. Among the Pleasantville DVD "Special Features" is a music-only feature with commentary by Randy Newman.

The music video for Fiona Apple's version of "Across the Universe", directed by Paul Thomas Anderson, uses the set of the diner from the film. AllMusic rated the album two-and-a-half stars out of five.

Notes

References

Further reading 
 Millar, Jeff. "Pleasantville" (review). Houston Chronicle. October 23, 1998.

External links 

 
 
 
 

1990s teen comedy-drama films
1998 films
American fantasy comedy-drama films
American satirical films
American teen comedy-drama films
Fictional television shows
Films about television
Films directed by Gary Ross
Films produced by Steven Soderbergh
Films scored by Randy Newman
Films set in the 1950s
Films set in 1958
Films set in the 1990s
Films partially in color
Films with screenplays by Gary Ross
Films about prejudice
New Line Cinema films
1998 directorial debut films
Magic realism films
Nostalgia in the United States
Films produced by Jon Kilik
1990s English-language films
1990s American films
Postmodern films